For the later 1920s British Richardson cyclcar made in Sheffield see Richardson (1919 cyclecar).

The Richardson was a British  cyclecar manufactured by J. R. Richardson of Saxilby, Lincolnshire, between 1903  and 1907. 

Three versions of the car were produced with 6.5 hp single, 12/14 hp twin or 18/20 hp four cylinder engines. The two larger cars had four speed gearboxes and they all had shaft drive.

Mr Richardson was also a manager at the French MASS car company and it is possible that the Richardson cars were actually re-badges MASS vehicles.

See also
 List of car manufacturers of the United Kingdom

References

Vintage vehicles
Defunct motor vehicle manufacturers of England
Cyclecars
Companies based in Lincolnshire